Beautiful Soul may refer to:

Beautiful Soul (Mamadee album), 2013, or the title track
Beautiful Soul (Jesse McCartney album), 2004
"Beautiful Soul" (song), Jesse McCartney 2004
Beautiful Soul (Cynthia Layne album), 2007, or the title track
Beautiful Soul: The ABC Dunhill Collection, a 2001 compilation album by Dusty Springfield, featuring tracks from Longing
"Beautiful Soul", a song by Kobo Town featuring Kellylee Evans on Independence  (2003) 
Beautiful Soul, Nigerian film directed by Tchidi Chikere, Africa Movie Academy Award for Best Screenplay 2008

See also 
A Beautiful Soul (disambiguation)